The Lee Creek Bridge in Natural Dam, Arkansas was a Pennsylvania through truss bridge that was built in 1934.

The bridge was listed on the National Register of Historic Places in 1990, at which time it was one of four surviving Pennsylvania through truss bridges in the state. Another bridge, in Van Buren, also crosses Lee Creek and is listed on the National Register.

This bridge was demolished and replaced in early 2018, and was removed from the National Register early in 2019.

See also
Lee Creek Bridge (Van Buren, Arkansas)
List of bridges documented by the Historic American Engineering Record in Arkansas
List of bridges on the National Register of Historic Places in Arkansas
National Register of Historic Places listings in Crawford County, Arkansas

References

External links

Historic American Engineering Record in Arkansas
Road bridges on the National Register of Historic Places in Arkansas
Bridges completed in 1934
Transportation in Crawford County, Arkansas
National Register of Historic Places in Crawford County, Arkansas
Pennsylvania truss bridges in the United States
1934 establishments in Arkansas
Former National Register of Historic Places in Arkansas
Demolished bridges in the United States
2018 disestablishments in Arkansas